Sinuber is a genus of predatory sea snails, marine gastropod mollusks in the family Naticidae, the moon snails.

Species
Species within the genus Sinuber include:

 Sinuber microstriatum Dell, 1990
 Sinuber sculptum (Martens, 1878)

References

External links

Naticidae